Earl of Salisbury is a title that has been created several times in English and British history. It has a complex history, and is now a subsidiary title to the marquessate of Salisbury.

Background
The title was first created for Patrick de Salisbury in the middle twelfth century. In 1196 the title passed to Patrick’s granddaughter, Ela, who married 
William Longespée, an illegitimate son of Henry II the same year. Ela was predeceased by husband, son and grandson, and was succeeded by her great-granddaughter, Margaret Longespée. Margaret married Henry de Lacy, 3rd Earl of Lincoln, and their daughter Alice eventually became Countess of Salisbury, in 1310, and of Lincoln, in 1311. Alice had married Thomas, Earl of Lancaster, in 1294. When the Earl of Lancaster lost his titles and was executed for treason in 1322, the Countess surrendered all of her titles to the King, and the titles lapsed.

The title was created for a second time in 1337 for William Montacute of the noble House of Montagu. This line ended in the sole heiress, Alice Montacute, and her husband Richard Neville took up the earldom 'by right of his wife'.

After Richard's death at the Battle of Barnet, in 1471 , the title was granted in 1472 to George, Duke of Clarence, who was married to Richard's eldest daughter. When the Duke of Clarence was executed in 1478 for treason (supposedly by being drowned in a vat of Malmsey wine), the title was forfeit. It was then granted to Edward of Middleham (who was his nephew via the Duke's brother Richard), who died in 1484 at the age of 10.

In 1605 the title was given to Robert Cecil, a close advisor to James I. Cecil was a son of Queen Elizabeth I's chief advisor, William Cecil, 1st Baron Burghley, and half-brother to Thomas Cecil, 1st Earl of Exeter. In 1789 James Cecil, the 7th Earl, was created the Marquess of Salisbury by George III.

Titleholders

First creation (1145)
 Patrick of Salisbury, 1st Earl of Salisbury (c. 1122-1168)
 William of Salisbury, 2nd Earl of Salisbury (d. 1196)
 Ela of Salisbury, 3rd Countess of Salisbury (1187–1261)
 William Longespée, 3rd Earl of Salisbury jure uxoris (c. 1176–1226)
 Margaret Longespée, 4th Countess of Salisbury (d. 1310)
Henry de Lacy, Earl of Salisbury jure uxoris (d. 1311)
 Alice de Lacy, 5th Countess of Salisbury (1281–1348) (forfeit 1322)

Second creation (1337)

 William Montagu, 1st Earl of Salisbury (1301–1344)
  William Montagu, 2nd Earl of Salisbury (1328–1397)
  John Montagu, 3rd Earl of Salisbury (1350–1400) (forfeit 1400)
  Thomas Montagu, 4th Earl of Salisbury (1388–1428) (restored 1421, although styled and summoned to parliament as such from at least 1409)
 Alice Montacute, 5th Countess of Salisbury (1407–1462)
  Richard Neville, 5th Earl of Salisbury jure uxoris 
  Richard Neville, 6th Earl of Salisbury (1428–1471) and jure uxoris 16th Earl of Warwick ("Warwick the Kingmaker") by his wife Anne Beauchamp, 16th Countess of Warwick (reverted to the crown 1471; by modern law it might, with his other titles, be abeyant).

Third creation (1472)
 George Plantagenet, 1st Earl of Salisbury (1449–1478) (forfeit 1478); son-in-law of the last Neville earl

Fourth creation (1478)
 Edward of Middleham, later Prince of Wales (1473–1484); nephew to George Plantagenet and grandson of the last Neville earl (extinct 1484)

Restoration of second or third creation (1512)
 Some sources call Edward Plantagenet, 17th Earl of Warwick (1475–1499) also Earl of Salisbury, but "there is no reason to suppose that he ever enjoyed that dignity".
 Margaret Plantagenet, Countess of Salisbury (1474–1541) (restored or created 1512; forfeit 1539), only sister of the above; sources differ on whether the Earldom of Salisbury restored to her was her father's (the third creation) or her grandfather's (second).

Fifth creation (1605)

Robert Cecil, 1st Earl of Salisbury (1563–1612)
William Cecil, 2nd Earl of Salisbury (1591–1668)
James Cecil, 3rd Earl of Salisbury (1648–1683)
James Cecil, 4th Earl of Salisbury (1666–1694)
James Cecil, 5th Earl of Salisbury (1691–1728)
James Cecil, 6th Earl of Salisbury (1713–1780)
James Cecil, 7th Earl of Salisbury (1748–1823) (created Marquess of Salisbury in 1789)
 see Marquess of Salisbury for further history

Notes

References

 
Earldoms in the Peerage of England
Neville family
Forfeited earldoms in the Peerage of England
Noble titles created in 1145
Noble titles created in 1337
Noble titles created in 1472
Noble titles created in 1478
Noble titles created in 1605